"Boston" is a song by American rock band Augustana, from their debut album All the Stars and Boulevards (2005). It was originally produced in 2003 by Jon King for their demo, Midwest Skies and Sleepless Mondays, and was later re-recorded with producer Brendan O'Brien for All the Stars and Boulevards.

Composition 
The sheet music for "Boston" is published in the key of C major, and is set in time signature of common time with a tempo of 147 beats per minute. Dan Layus's vocal range spans from A3 to G5.

Augustana bassist Jared Palomar has stated that the song is loosely based on one of Layus' high school classmates who left to attend Duke University.  Palomar said, "It's more the idea of getting away from everything and starting over."  Asked about the meaning of "Boston" in the song, Layus replied: "You know, growing up, I had extended family on the outskirts of Boston, and we’d fly out there for the holidays fairly often, and I always loved it out there, in my mind it always seemed like the farthest point away from California that you could go.... I must have been tapping into that when I was writing that song 'Boston' ...."

Music video
The music video starts with the lead singer (Dan Layus) playing a piano on a beach with the sea at low tide initially, later showing numerous other abandoned pianos on the beach. As the video progresses, other band members appear. Soon after, high tide comes up and the entire band continues to play as they are submerged in water over and over. Band members have been shown to be struggling to keep up with their musical instruments, but they do not seem to give up playing even in such adverse conditions. The video ends showing all musical instruments left shattered by the sea waves.

Use in popular media
"Boston" was used in the third season finale of One Tree Hill, "The Show Must Go On", when Brooke Davis and Lucas Scott have their last dance as a couple. Nathan and Haley drive away to their honey moon meanwhile Lucas confesses to Peyton that he told Brooke about their kiss in the library. It was also featured in Scrubs, 19th episode of the fifth season, "His Story 3", in The Big Bang Theory, 3rd episode of the first season ("The Fuzzy Boots Corollary") and in "Here Comes the Judge", the 15th episode of season one of Shark. It's also heard in the film A Warrior's Heart.

Charts

References

Songs about Boston
2005 singles
Augustana (band) songs
Song recordings produced by Brendan O'Brien (record producer)
2005 songs
Epic Records singles